The United States Consumer Product Safety Commission (USCPSC, CPSC, or commission) is an independent agency of the United States government.  The CPSC seeks to promote the safety of consumer products by addressing “unreasonable risks” of injury (through coordinating recalls, evaluating products that are the subject of consumer complaints or industry reports, etc.); developing uniform safety standards (some mandatory, some through a voluntary standards process); and conducting research into product-related illness and injury. In part due to its small size, the CPSC attempts to coordinate with outside parties—including companies and consumer advocates—to leverage resources and expertise to achieve outcomes that advance consumer safety. The agency was created in 1972 through the Consumer Product Safety Act. The agency reports to Congress and the President; it is not part of any other department or agency in the federal government. The CPSC has five commissioners, who are nominated by the president and confirmed by the Senate for staggered seven-year terms. Historically, the commission was often run by three commissioners or fewer. Since 2009, however, the agency has generally been led by five commissioners, one of whom serves as chairman. The commissioners set policy for the CPSC. The CPSC is headquartered in Bethesda, Maryland.

Leadership
The commissioners of the CPSC are appointed by the U.S. president and with the consent of the U.S. Senate. As with some other U.S. federal independent agencies, commissioners are selected as members of political parties. Although the president is entitled by statute to select the chairman (with the consent of the Senate), no more than three commissioners may belong to the same party. Thus, the president is generally expected to consult with members of the opposite party in the Senate to select members of the commission from the opposite party. The commissioners (including the chairman) vote on selecting the vice chairman, who becomes acting chairman if the chairman’s term ends upon resignation or expiration.

Chairmen 

The commission is led by Chairman Alexander Hoehn-Saric, a Democrat. Prior to his 2021 confirmation, the commission had not had a Senate-confirmed chairman since 2017, when Elliot F. Kaye stepped down as chair following a White House request after Donald Trump’s inauguration. In March 2020, President Trump nominated Nancy Beck, an official at the U.S. Environmental Protection Agency who previously worked for an association representing the U.S. chemical industry, to chair the commission, but it was not acted on by the Senate.

Current commissioners
 As of October 17, 2022, the commission had a Democratic majority, 3-to-1.

Scope

The CPSC regulates the manufacture and sale of more than 15,000 different consumer products, from cribs to all-terrain vehicles. Products excluded from the CPSC’s jurisdiction include those specifically named by law as under the jurisdiction of other federal agencies. For example, on-road automobiles are regulated by the National Highway Traffic Safety Administration, guns are regulated by the Bureau of Alcohol, Tobacco, Firearms, and Explosives, and drugs are regulated by the Food and Drug Administration.

Activities
The CPSC fulfills its mission by banning dangerous consumer products, establishing safety requirements for other consumer products, issuing recalls of products already on the market, and researching potential hazards associated with consumer products.

Recalls 
The aspect of CPSC’s work that most U.S. citizens might recognize is the “recall,” formally a “corrective action” in which a company develops a “a comprehensive plan that reaches throughout the entire distribution chain to consumers who have the product” and addresses a potential or alleged failure of a product. Recalls are nearly always voluntary. While many recalls involve consumers returning consumer products to the manufacturer for a replacement or, more rarely, a refund, recalls have also involved tasks such as instructing users on how to clean an item or publishing a software patch. Most recalls recover very few consumer products, for a variety of hypothesized reasons. Industry and consumer advocates are often at odds over whether recalls need to be more effective, as many consumers may simply discard products that are the subject of recalls. Whether a consumer learns of a recall in the first place is a different question. One commissioner has called for companies to spend as much on recall advertising as the companies do on their advertising of the products before recalls.

Rulemaking 
The CPSC makes rules about consumer products when it identifies a consumer product hazard that is not already addressed by an industry voluntary consensus standard, or when Congress directs it to do so. Its rules can specify basic design requirements, or they can amount to product bans, as in the case of small high-powered magnets, which the CPSC attempted to ban. For certain infant products, the CPSC regulates even when voluntary standards exist. The CPSC is required to follow a rigorous, scientific process to develop mandatory rules. Failing to do so can justify the revocation of a rule, as was the case in a Tenth Circuit  decision vacating the CPSC’s ban on small high-powered magnets.

Information gathering & information sharing
The CPSC learns about unsafe products in several ways. The agency maintains a consumer hotline through which consumers may report concerns about unsafe products or injuries associated with products. Product safety concerns may also be submitted through SaferProducts.gov. The agency also operates the National Electronic Injury Surveillance System (NEISS), a probability sample of about 100 hospitals with 24-hour emergency rooms. NEISS collects data on consumer product related injuries treated in ERs and can be used to generate national estimates.

The agency also works with and shares information with other governments, both in the U.S. (with states and public health agencies) and with international counterparts.

Publicity & communication
The CPSC works on a variety of publicity campaigns to raise awareness of safety.

Fireworks 
Annually, the CPSC blows up mannequins to demonstrate the dangers of improper use of fireworks.

Drowning prevention 
See also Virginia Graeme Baker Pool and Spa Safety Act

In connection with the U.S. swimming season (the northern hemisphere’s summer, roughly May to September), the CPSC conducts the “Pool Safely” campaign to prevent drowning through methods such as building fences and supporting education programs. Other efforts include attempts to prevent suction entrapment, which can kill by trapping a swimmer underwater, by eviscerating a swimmer’s internal organs (when a suction tube lacks a cover), or otherwise.

Enforcement
Since February 2015, the average civil penalty has been $2.9 million. In April 2018, Polaris Industries agreed to pay a record $27.25 million civil penalty for failing to report defective off-road vehicles.

Funding and staff
In 1972 when the agency was created, it had a budget of $34.7 million and 786 staff members. By 2008 it had 401 employees on a budget of $43 million, but the Consumer Product Safety Improvement Act passed in 2008 increases funding $136.4 million in 2014 with full-time employees to at least 500 by 2013. Funding dropped to $127 million as of the commission’s fiscal year 2019 appropriation, and it continues to have slightly more than 500 employees.

Mid-2000s reform following the “Year of the Recall” 

The year 2007 was called the “Year of the Recall” by some CPSC-watchers in the United States. The CPSC worked with manufacturers and importers on a record 473 voluntary recalls that year, and other U.S. federal agencies promoted other widely noted recalls. CPSC recalls included many incidents with lead in toys and other children’s products.

Consumer Product Safety Improvement Act of 2008 
These issues led to the legislative interest in the reform of the agency, and the final result of these efforts was the passage of the Consumer Product Safety Improvement Act in 2008. The bill increased funding and staffing for the CPSC, placed stricter limits on lead levels in children’s products (redefined from products intended for children age seven and under to children age twelve and under), restricted certain phthalates in children’s toys and child care articles, and required mandatory testing and certification of applicable products. The Danny Keysar Child Product Notification Act required the CPSC to create a public database of recalled products and to provide consumers with a postage-paid postcard for each durable infant or toddler product. This act was named after Danny Keysar, who died in a recalled crib. Danny’s parents, Linda E. Ginzel and Boaz Keysar, founded Kids In Danger and were instrumental in working with the CPSC to strengthen product safety standards.

Creation of public database 
The public database (saferproducts.gov), constructed at a cost of around US$3 million and launched in March 2011, “publicizes complaints from virtually anyone who can provide details about a safety problem connected with any of the 15,000 kinds of consumer goods regulated by the CPSC.” While lauded by consumer advocates for making previously hidden information available, manufacturers have expressed their concern “that most of the complaints are not first vetted by the CPSC before they are made public,” meaning it could be abused and potentially used to target specific brands. As of mid-April 2011, the database was accruing about 30 safety complaints per day. By June 2018, the database had 36,544 reports, with an average of approximately 13.74 reports filed each day.

Controversies

Recall of inclined infant sleepers 
In 2019, the CPSC recalled inclined sleepers sold by multiple companies (including Mattel Fisher-Price’s Rock ’n Play as well as Kids II’s and Dorel’s rocking sleepers sold under a variety of brand names). The recalled products were associated with more than 30 infant deaths according to contemporary news reports. The controversy was among those that were tied to Acting Chairman Ann Marie Burekle’s announcement of her intention to step down after waiting for years for the U.S. Senate to act on her nomination to serve an additional term and be formally elevated to full chairmanship.

Recall of jogging strollers in 2019 after settlement in 2018 
The CPSC sued the maker of Britax jogging strollers, then settled with the company, in 2018. Reports attributed the change to the change in personnel after Republicans gained a majority on the commission, although some commentators noted the unusual circumstances of the commission suing over a product that met existing standards. The 2018 settlement included the company’s agreement to provide a replacement part to consumers. The replacement part—a bolt—itself was later recalled because it broke easily.

Attempt to ban small, high-powered magnets 

In 2012, following reports of consumers (mostly children) ingesting small, high-powered magnets made of rare earth materials such as neodynium, the commission voted to block sales of Maxfield & Oberton’s Buckyballs-branded toys, and later voted to issue a rule that would amount to a ban on all similar toys. Later, however, a federal appellate court overturned the ban, finding that the Commission had moved forward without adequate data. The decision vacating the ban was written by later-Supreme Court Justice Neil Gorsuch.

Industry-sponsored travel in the early 2000s 
On November 2, 2007, The Washington Post reported that between 2002 and the date of their report, former chairman Hal Stratton and current commissioner and former acting chairman Nancy Nord had taken more than 30 trips paid for by manufacturing groups or lobbyists representing industries that are under the supervision of the agency. According to the Post, the groups paid for over $60,000 travel and related expenses during this time.

Surviving challenges to the commission’s continued existence 
The CPSC’s creation was not without controversy, and the agency survived attempts to close it in its first decades. In 1981, President Ronald Reagan’s head of the Office of Management & Budget, David Stockman, sought to end the authorization for the agency to move it inside the Department of Commerce. The agency was given a new lease on life following agreement among U.S. senators.

See also

 Child-resistant packaging
 Consumer Product Safety Improvement Act
 Injury prevention
 Lead-based paint in the United States
 Title 16 of the Code of Federal Regulations
 Toy safety

References

External links

 Consumer Product Safety Commission in the Federal Register
 Consumer Product Safety Commission on USAspending.gov
 Federal Hazardous Substances Act (PDF/details) as amended in the GPO Statute Compilations collection
The Consumer Product Safety Commission (CPSC) and International Trade: Legal Issues Congressional Research Service

 
Government agencies established in 1972
Bethesda, Maryland
Organizations based in Maryland
Product safety